New York Pro Musica was a vocal and instrumental ensemble based in New York City, which specialized in Medieval and Renaissance music. It was co-founded in 1952, under the name Pro Musica Antiqua, by Noah Greenberg, a choral director, and Bernard Krainis, a recorder player who studied with Erich Katz.  Other prominent musicians who joined included Russell Oberlin (the first American countertenor) and Martha Blackman (the first American gambist) and Frederick Renz, who founded Early Music Foundation after Pro Musica disbanded.

The ensemble is perhaps best known for reviving the medieval Play of Daniel in the 1950s, which has since become a popular liturgical drama among early music groups. The group gave its first concert at the New School for Social Research in New York City on April 26, 1953. The ensemble performed in 1960 for the Peabody Mason Concert series in Boston. The group continued after Greenberg's death in 1966 and disbanded in 1974. Greenberg's successor, musicologist John Reeves White, took over the direction of the ensemble in 1966; the last director was George Houle, who tried to bring the group more in line with trends in Europe at a time when the United States was not ready for such changes. Houle went on to teach musicology at Stanford University.

Select discography
New York Pro Musica: An Anthology of Their Greatest Works, Noah Greenberg, conductor. 7 record set. Everest Records (1966, Everest 3145/7)

References

External links
 The New York Pro Musica archives in the Music Division of The New York Public Library for the Performing Arts.

Early music groups
Musical groups established in 1952
1952 establishments in New York (state)
Musical groups disestablished in 1974
1974 disestablishments in New York (state)
Musical groups from New York City